Prudent avoidance is a precautionary principle in risk management. It states that reasonable efforts to minimise potential risks should be taken when the actual magnitude of the risks is unknown.  The principle was proposed by Prof. Granger Morgan of Carnegie Mellon University in 1989 in the context of electromagnetic radiation safety (in particular, fields produced by power lines).

A report for the Office of Technology Assessment of the US Congress described prudent avoidance of power line fields as:

The principle has been adopted in a number of countries, for example Sweden, Denmark, Norway, Australia and New Zealand.  While not adopted by any regulatory body at the national level in the USA, the principle has been adopted in some form by a number of local regulatory bodies, for example the public utility commissions in California, Colorado, Connecticut and Hawaii.  The Colorado Public Commission states:

The prudent avoidance principle is seen as a better alternative than other proposed approaches to risk management, such as ALARP, because it makes reasonable efforts to reduce possible risk without creating a specific numeric standard that is not supported by strong scientific evidence.

References

 Nair I, Morgan MG, Florig HK. Biologic effects of power frequency electric and magnetic fields. Office of Technology Assessment Report OTA-BP-E-53. Washington, DC:U.S. Office of Technology Assessment, 1989.
 Jack Sahl and Michael Dolan (1996) An Evaluation of Precaution-based Approaches As EMF Policy Tools in Community Environments.  Environmental Health Perspectives Volume 104, Number 9, September 1996
 Colorado Public Commission (CPUC). Statement of adoption in the matter of the rules for electric utilities of the Colorado Public Utilities Commission. Code of Colorado Regulation-723-3 concerning electric and magnetic fields. Denver, CO:Colorado Public Commission, 1992.

Risk management